Konami's Open Golf Championship is a 1994 arcade game developed and published by Konami. This game is a sequel to Konami's earlier arcade game Golfing Greats, released three years earlier in 1991, and it is known as Golfing Greats 2 in Japan. While the original Golfing Greats used the same hardware as Teenage Mutant Ninja Turtles: Turtles in Time, Golfing Greats 2 uses the SYSTEM-GX hardware, allowing for better graphics.

Gameplay
Konami's Open Golf Championship is a golf simulation played with a joystick.

Reception
Next Generation reviewed the arcade version of the game, rating it two stars out of five, and stated that "This could have been a good game if its control were better, rather than the decent game it is."

See also
Ultra Golf
ESPN Final Round Golf 2002

References

1994 video games
Arcade video games
Arcade-only video games
Golf video games
Konami arcade games
Konami games
Video games developed in Japan